Bethnal Green is a London Overground station on the Lea Valley lines in the southern part of Bethnal Green, in East London. It is an interchange station between three services operated by London Overground. Its three-letter station code is BET and it is in Travelcard zone 2.

The station was opened in 1872 and was formerly called Bethnal Green Junction until 1946; it was also formerly served by trains on the Great Eastern Main Line (GEML) via . The station is situated on Three Colts Lane and is within walking distance to Bethnal Green Road via Wilmot Street. It is some distance from the other Bethnal Green station on the London Underground's Central line.

History

Before opening
The first railway in the Bethnal Green area was opened by the Eastern Counties Railway (ECR). The ECR had opened its line from Romford to a temporary terminus at Devonshire Street. Their new terminus at Spitalfields was completed on 1 July 1840 and the line opened through Bethnal Green. As well as passenger facilities at Spitalfields, there were goods facilities adjacent to the line from the Bethnal Green site to the terminus.
By the 1860s the railways in East Anglia were in financial trouble, and most were leased to the ECR; they wished to amalgamate formally, but could not obtain government agreement for this until 1862, when the Great Eastern Railway (GER) was formed by amalgamation. The main line past the site then became a GER line in 1862.

By the early to mid-1860s it was clear the original Bishopsgate terminus (it was renamed from Spitalfields in 1846) was not big enough to cope with the and with increasing suburban development north and east of the area, the GER decided to build a new terminus at Liverpool Street and extend the suburban network. A new line that ran north form the Bethnal Green site to Enfield Town was opened in May 1872 and a month later from Hackney Downs railway station to Chingford. Both these openings meant these services no longer needed to be routed via Stratford railway station which was also becoming an increasingly congested location at the time.

Great Eastern Railway (1872–1922)
It was as part of this expansion that Bethnal Green Junction was opened in May 1872. It replaced a nearby station called Mile End (not to be confused with the current Underground station of the same name) which was located on the eastern side of Cambridge Heath Road.

To the west of the station the new Liverpool Street terminus was being constructed but this was not ready. A new station at Bishopsgate (Low Level) had been constructed and initial services towards London terminated there for a short period. On 2 October 1874 operations commenced through to Liverpool Street. At this time there were a single pair of tracks ready for traffic with two more were being constructed. These opened in May 1875 and the new Liverpool Street opened on 1 November 1875 with the old Bishopsgate station closing to passengers on the same day. The line towards Liverpool Street fell at a 1 in 70 gradient west of the station whilst the Bishopsgate lines continued on a more or less level gradient.

Bethnal Green had four platforms two of which served the Enfield/Chingford lines and two of which served the Great Eastern Main line towards Stratford. 
The old Bishopsgate station was converted to a goods depot and some rearrangement of the original facilities took place in an area which became known as Spitalfields Depot. The depot included a wagon hoist that allowed wagons to be transferred to the East London Line which operated at a lower level. A direct rail link had been planned here in the 1880s but was never developed.

By the 1880s it was clear that Liverpool Street required further extension and this included a third set of running lines between Bethnal Green and the terminus. Parliamentary approval was given in 1888 with work starting in 1890. The new set of lines were opened on 4 April 1891 and at Bethnal Green the tracks were rearranged so trains from Enfield and Chingford used these. The former GEML tracks were now served by suburban trains to and from Stratford whilst two new lines through the area acted as the through lines for longer distance trains.

In 1891 an additional two tracks were opened between Globe Road and Devonshire Street and Bethnal Green where room for a further two tracks was provided for. Then in 1894 an additional pair of tracks were opened between Bethnal Green and Hackney Downs.

During World War 1 the station was considered for closure along with some lesser used stations including Bishopsgate (Low Level), Globe Road & Devonshire Street and Cambridge Heath It was however reprieved, possibly because it was positioned centrally to the three named station above, all of which were closed in 1916.

From 1920 Bethnal Green was served by the revamped suburban Jazz service.

LNER (1923–1948)
After the Railways Act 1921 the country's railways were grouped into four companies, with effect from 1 January 1923. At Bethnal Green, the London & North Eastern Railway (LNER) took over operations of the GER services.

Little changed during the 1920s but by the 1930s thoughts were turning to electrifying the Great Eastern Main Line and extending the Central Line east from Liverpool Street to Stratford and then to Ongar and Fairlop. One of the first tasks was the construction of a flyover at Ilford. Work stalled on both projects during World War 2.

Trains on the Great Eastern Main Line (GEML) between Liverpool Street and Stratford ceased calling at Bethnal Green on 8 December 1946 and two platforms were closed, though the remains of the eastbound platform are still in situ and visible from the GEML. The London-bound platform was demolished and the tracks rearranged, coinciding with the swapping of services from the former "fast" tracks onto the former "slow" tracks, resulting in the arrangement utilised today.

Following closure of the main line platforms in 1946 only Enfield Town, Chingford and Seven Sisters services would have called at Bethnal Green. It was at this time that Junction was dropped from the station name.

British Railways (1948–1994)
On nationalisation in 1948 responsibility for operating the station fell to British Railways (Eastern Region).

In 1949 electric services started operating between Liverpool Street and Chadwell Heath being extended later to Shenfield and in 1956 Chelmsford. The full opening of the Ilford flyover had led to a re-organisation of the lines through Bethnal Green with these services now operating on what were the main lines.

The lines through Hackney were electrified in the late 1950s with electric services commencing operation on 21 November 1960 to Chingford and Enfield Town.
In 1964 a disastrous fire at Bishopsgate goods depot saw traffic cease and by 1967 following further decline in goods traffic, the goods depot at Spitalfields closed to traffic.

The platform awnings were cut back in 1966 and by the early 1980s the original GER platform buildings were in poor condition and demolished in 1985/1986 and replaced by spartan brick-built structures.

The privatisation era (1994 – present day)

After privatisation in April 1994 the services calling at Bethnal Green were operated by a train operating unit before the franchise was won by West Anglia Great Northern Railway. The table below shows how the franchises that served Bethnal Green have changed over the years:

Control of the infrastructure was passed to Railtrack but was then passed to Network Rail in 2002.

Services
The following off-peak weekday services currently call at Bethnal Green:

Operations

Signal Boxes
By 1900 there were four signal boxes operating in the area:
Middle Signal Box was located between East London Junction on the gradient up towards Bethnal Green. Bethnal Green West End box controlled the crossover and west end of the station whilst Bethnal Green East controlled the eastern and northern approaches to the area. Granary Junction was the main signal box controlling the approaches to Bishopsgate Goods Yard (as it was by then) and the sidings at Spitalfields. 
The first Granary Junction box was opened in 1872 and was replaced in 1880 with both structures being on the south side of the goods lines. This second box lasted until 15 January when a third box was opened this time on the north side of the line. The box had a pioneering electro-pneumatically operated table lever frame produced by McKenzie & Holland and this was preserved when the box closed on 9 October 1966. The frame is now (2021) at the UK National Railway Museum.

Bethnal Green West (built 1891) stood at the end of platforms 2 and 3. It was a McKenzie and Holland frame with 84 working levers.

Bethnal Green East (built 1891) stood in the area between the Hackney line and the Great Eastern Main line. The box lost its semaphores on 27 November 1935 when the line between Bethnal Green and Hackney Downs was converted to Track Circuit Block and automatic colour light signalling.

The area was re-signalled after the war and Bethnal Green West (closed 13 April 1947) and Bethnal Green East (closed 5 February 1949) signal boxes were closed and replaced by a flat roofed brick build structure located in the V between the junction that operated from 6 February 1949 to closure on 25 March 1989 when a further re-signalling scheme saw control transferred to Liverpool Street signalling centre.

Timekeepers Office
The station had another structure that was similar in appearance to the signal box but was in fact a timekeepers office. Here the planned train service was monitored and where trains were running late their performance was communicated out to signallers down the line. The statistics would have also been used by the GE and later LNER to understand how the service was running.

The box opened in approximately 1891 and continued in use until after nationalisation. It was located on the up local platform which was demolished after closure in December 1946 (although the box had gone before closure). However two posts were transferred to the new box in 1949 and in the early years the function of the timekeepers there was:
 Lean out of the window and get the next working (as advised by the crew shouting the details) of any light engines (locomotive only ) moves that were proceeding towards Liverpool Street. This was then telephoned though to the main panel at Liverpool Street station.
 The second was to input the Liverpool Street platform details into a train describer again to assist the operation of the terminus station.

Accidents
On 4 September 1953, a passenger train derailed when a set of points moved under it.
On 17 June 1962, a southbound passenger train was derailed due to a track fault.  Seventeen passengers were injured.
On 12 February 1964 a train of empty stock was derailed when a set of points moved underneath it. The location was very similar to the 1962 accident at the eastern end of the station.

Spitalfields Engine Shed

There was a small single track engine shed on the south side of the line as part of the Spitalfields goods yard. Precise opening date is unknown but thought to be late 1860s/early 1870s with its earliest mention being in 1872. It housed shunting locomotives that worked Bishopsgate Goods depot and the Spitalfields coal sidings which were in use 24 hours per day. The locomotives allocated were generally GE classes such as GER Class C72 (LNE classification J68), GER Class R24 (LNE classification J67) and GER Class S56 (LNE classification J69) and allocated to Stratford engine shed. In the late 1950s traffic declined and a single diesel shunter was able to deal with the traffic. As a result, the shed closed c1959/60.

References

External links

Railway station
Former Great Eastern Railway stations
Railway stations in the London Borough of Tower Hamlets
Railway stations in Great Britain opened in 1872
Railway stations served by London Overground